

Sturmbannführer was a Nazi Party paramilitary rank equivalent to major that was used in several Nazi organizations, such as the SA, SS, and the NSFK. The rank originated from German shock troop units of the First World War.

The SA title of Sturmbannführer was first established in 1921. In 1928, the title became an actual rank and was also one of the first established SS ranks. The insignia of a Sturmbannführer was four silver pips centered on a collar patch. The rank rated below Standartenführer until 1932, when Sturmbannführer became subordinate to the new rank of Obersturmbannführer. In the Waffen-SS, Sturmbannführer was considered equivalent to a major in the German Wehrmacht.

Various Waffen-SS units composed of foreign recruits were considered distinct from the German SS, and thus they were not permitted to wear SS runes on their collar tabs but had their divisional insignia instead. Their ranks were also prepended with "Waffen" instead of "SS", as in, Waffen-Sturmbannführer.

The rank was held by Wernher von Braun, who developed the V-2 rocket, and later designed the Saturn V rocket for the U.S. space program. Other rank holders included Eberhard Heder, Otto Günsche, and war criminals, such as Otto Förschner, who was the commandant of Dora-Mittelbau concentration camp.

Rank insignia

See also
 Table of ranks and insignia of the Waffen-SS

Citations

Bibliography

 
 
 
 
 

SS ranks